Pohnpeian is a Micronesian language spoken as the indigenous language of the island of Pohnpei in the Caroline Islands. Pohnpeian has approximately 30,000 (estimated) native speakers living in Pohnpei and its outlying atolls and islands with another 10,000-15,000 (estimated) living off island in parts of the US mainland, Hawaii and Guam. It is the second-most widely spoken native language of the Federated States of Micronesia.

Pohnpeian features a "high language" including some specialized vocabulary, used in speaking about people of high rank.

Classification

Pohnpeian is most closely related to the Chuukic languages of Chuuk (formerly Truk). Ngatikese, Pingelapese and Mwokilese of the Pohnpeic languages are closely related languages to Pohnpeian. Pohnpeian shares 81% lexical similarity with Pingelapese, 75% with Mokilese, and 36% with Chuukese.

Pohnpeian employs a great deal of loanwords from colonial languages such as English, Japanese, Spanish, and German. However, these "loanwords" are neither spelled or pronounced the same as the source language.

Phonology

The modern Pohnpeian orthography uses twenty letters — sixteen single letters and four digraphs — collated in a unique order:

As German missionaries designed an early form of the orthography, Pohnpeian spelling uses -h to mark a long vowel, rather like German: dohl 'mountain'. The IPA equivalents of written Pohnpeian are as follows:

Phonotactics
Pohnpeian phonotactics generally allow syllables consisting of consonants (C) and vowels (V) accordingly: V, VC, CV, CVC. This basic system is complicated by Pohnpeian orthographical conventions and phonological processes. Thus, sahu is pronounced , never . While the glide  is never written other than as i the glide  may be written between u and a non-high vowel: suwed ("bad").

Words beginning in nasal consonant clusters may be pronounced as written, or with a leading prothetic vowel. The roundedness of the prothetic vowel depends on that of the adjacent consonant cluster and the first written syllable. For example, nta can be said  ("blood"), and ngkapwan may be  ("a while ago"); but mpwer is optionally  ("twin"), and ngkopw may be  (a species of crab).

Substitution and assimilation
Further phonological constraints frequently impact the pronunciation and spelling of consonant clusters, triggered variously by reduplication and assimilation into neighboring sounds. Sound changes, especially in reduplication, are often reflected by a change in spelling. However, processes triggered by affixes as well as adjacent words are not indicated in spelling. In order to inflect, derive, and pronounce Pohnpeian words properly, the order of operations must generally begin with liquid assimilation, followed by nasal assimilation, and end with nasal substitution.

First, liquid assimilation is seen most often in reduplication alongside spelling changes.

The second process, nasal assimilation, presents two varieties: partial and complete. For example, the prefix nan- ("in") produces: nanpar, pronounced  ("trade wind season"); nanpwungara, said  ("between them"); and nankep, said  ("inlet"). Partial assimilation also occurs across word boundaries: kilin pwihk is pronounced .

In complete nasal assimilation,  assimilates into adjacent liquid consonants to produce  or : lin + linenek > lillinenek ("oversexed," spelling change from reduplication); nanrek is said  ("season of plenty"). Complete nasal assimilation also occurs across word boundaries: pahn lingan is said  ("will be beautiful").

The third process, nasal substitution, also presents two varieties. Both varieties of nasal substitution affect adjacent consonants of the same type: alveolar (coronal), bilabial, or velar. The first variety is often triggered by reduplication, resulting in spelling changes: sel is reduplicated to sensel ("tired").

The second variety of nasal substitution, limited to bilabial and velar consonants, occurs across word and morpheme boundaries: kalap pahn is pronounced as if it were kalam pahn ("always will be"); Soulik kin soupisek is pronounced as if it were souling kin soupisek ("Soulik is [habitually] busy"). This second variety of the nasal substitution process is phonemically more productive than the first: it includes all results possible in the first variety, as well as additional cluster combinations, indicated in green below. Some alveolar pairs produce an intervening vowel, represented as V below. Not all clusters are possible, and not all are assimilative, however.

By following the order of operations, reduplication of the word sel ("tired") progresses thus: *selsel > *sessel (liquid assimilation) > sensel (nasal substitution). In this case, the same result is achieved by nasal substitution alone.

1 In the Pohnpeic languages, geminate obstruents are realized as homorganic nasal-obstruent clusters.
2 Often before .
3 Before .
4 The reflex is *∅ sporadically before PMc *e.

Grammar

Pohnpeian word order is nominally SVO. Depending on the grammatical function, the head may come before or after its dependents. Like many Austronesian languages, Pohnpeian focus marking interacts with transitivity and relative clauses (see Austronesian alignment). Its range of grammatically acceptable sentence structures is more generally (1) noun phrase, (2) verb phrase (3) other noun phrases, where the contents of the leading noun phrase may vary according to the speaker's focus. If the leading noun phrase is not the subject, it is followed by the focus particle me. Normally, the object phrase is last among predicates:

Honorific speech

Honorific speech is used in several settings as a way of showing honor and respect to older ones, those who have been assigned titles, royalty, and in almost all religious settings. Depending on the second or third person, a given sentence may vary widely because honorific speech comprises a separate vocabulary, including all parts of speech and topics both lofty and mundane. Examples include: pohnkoiohlap (to eat with the nahnmwarki), likena (high chief's wife), pahnkupwur (chest; normally mwarmware), pahnpwoal (armpit; normally pahnpeh), dauso (anus, normally pwoar), kelipa (to joke, normally kamwan), kaluhlu (to vomit), and keipweni (an interjection). Although at times in the absence of a specific honorific word, the word "Ketin" is often used to indicate that the proceeding verb is honoric ("Koht kin ketin kapikada" would translate to "God creates"). The word "Ketin" has no meaning by itself. However, when used as a prefix, it is a sure way to distinguish honorific speech ("Kiong" has the meaning of "Give", "Ketkiong" would be the honorific version of the same word)

Nouns

Nouns may be singular, dual, or plural in number, and generally inflect by suffixing. Numerals usually follow the nouns they count, and agree in noun class. Groups of nouns and adjectives comprise noun phrases. Pohnpeian transitive sentences contain up to three noun phrases.

Inalienable, or direct, possession is marked by personal suffixes. Other forms of possession are indicated through possessive classifiers. The construct suffix -n appears in oblique positions, such as possessive phrases. Words ending in n, however, are followed by the clitic en. Possessive phrases generally add this construct state to a classifier noun, followed by the possessor, and lastly the possessum. For example: weren ohlo war (POSSESSIVECLASS:CANOE-n that-man canoe) means "that man's canoe."

Some possessive classifiers, namely ah and nah, may precede the possessum: nein ohlo (nah) rasaras (CLASS:-n that-man [CLASS] saw) means "that man's saw." Possessive classifiers can also occur with more than one following noun. The classifier itself may give a particular meaning to the possessum: pwihk means "pig;" nah pwihk means "his (live) pig;" ah pwihk means "his (butchered) pig;" and kene pwihk means "his pig (to eat)."

Determiners
Determiners in Pohnpeian may occurs as enclitics which are bound morphemes or independent words and occur in three basic types: demonstrative modifiers, pointing demonstratives, and demonstrative pronouns. All of the determiners have a three-way diectic distinction of proximal (near the speaker), medial (near the listener), and distal (away from both the speaker and listener), as well as an emphatic/non-emphatic distinction. Demonstratives are generally, suffixed to or following the last word of a noun phrase. Orthographically singular clitics are suffixed to the word, while plurals are written as separate words.

Demonstrative modifiers
Demonstrative modifiers occur as enclitics with nouns and always occupy the last element in a noun phrase.

The singular emphatic demonstrative modifiers are formed by suffixing the non-emphatic singular forms to appropriate numeral classifier for the noun, such as men- for animate nouns. The plural forms are always constructed by suffixing the non-emphatic plural form to pwu- regardless of the singular classifier.

Examples of the demonstrative modifiers in use are

Pointing modifiers
Pointing modifiers are determiners that can stand alone in a noun phrase and are used in equational (non-verbal) sentences. They can also occur by themselves as one word sentences. They have both non-emphatic and emphatic forms.

Example uses of pointing modifiers:
 Iet noumw naipen 'Here is your knife'
 Ietakan noumw naip akan 'Here are your knives'
 Iet! 'Here it is!'
 Iohkan! 'There they are! (away from you and me)

Demonstrative pronouns
Demonstrative pronouns are determiners that can replace noun phrases in a verbal sentence. They have both non-emphatic and emphatic forms.

Examples of demonstrative pronouns in use:
 Met ohla 'This is broken'
 E wahla mwo 'He/she took it there away from you and me'
 Mwohkan ohla 'Those are broken'
 E wahwei men 'He/she took it there by you'

Pronouns

The relative pronoun me means "one who is" or "which," and is used with adjectives and general verbs: Ih me kehlail (He one strong > He is the strong one); Ih me mwenge (He one eat > He is the one who ate).

Possessive classifiers

Possessive classifiers are used frequently and differentiate among person, possessum, and honorific usage. Their personal forms appear below:

Further possessive classifiers include: sapwellime (third person honorific), were (vehicles, canoes), nime (drinkable things), imwe (buildings, homes), ulunge (pillows), sapwe (land), kie (things to sleep on), tie (earrings), mware (garlands, titles, names), ipe (covers, sheets), kene (edibles), and seike (catch of fish).

Specialized kinship classifiers include: kiseh (relatives), sawi (clan members), rie (sibling in Crow kinship), wahwah (man's sister-relation's children), and toki (persons with whom one has had sexual intercourse).

Honorifics 

Honorifics comprise a largely separate vocabulary.

Numbers and measure words 

Numbers normally follow the nouns they count, however they may be pre-posed in certain situations. Numbers and measure words depend on the grammatical class and physical characteristics of the object being counted. The several number systems are grouped by linguists into three sets, reflecting their term for "ten." When naming numbers in order, natives most often use the –u class. Ngoul is an alternate word for "ten" for -pak and -sou classifiers.

Higher numerals such as pwiki "hundred", kid "thousand", do not inflect for noun class. The ehd system, above is likewise not class-based.

Ordinals are formed with the prefix ka–, pronounced as ke– in certain words.

Verbs

Pohnpeian distinguishes between intransitive and transitive verbs. Transitive verbs are those with both a subject and an object. Intransitive verbs indicate most other verbal, adjectival, and adverbial relationships. Within verb phrases, aspect markers are followed by adverbs, and lastly the main verb.

Many, if not most, transitive and intransitive verbs share common roots, though their derivation is often unpredictable. Some thematic features among intransitive verbs include ablaut, reduplication, the suffix -ek, and the prefix pV, where V stands for any vowel. Thematic suffixes among transitive verbs include -ih and -VC, where C stands for any consonant. Some transitive verbs also end in a final short vowel.

Pohnpeian indicates four grammatical aspects: unrealized, habitual, durative, and perfective. Alternations in vowel length, as well as ablaut, are a salient feature of the aspect paradigm.

Pohnpeian permits relative clauses and conjoined clauses through use of conjunctions and conjunctive adverbs. The language also permits verbs within nominal clauses as gerundive clauses, finite clauses, and infinitive clauses.

Pohnpeian verbs allow for a high level of affixation. The allowable suffixes and their ordering is presented in the table below.

Intransitive verbs

Pohnpeian intransitive verbs can be divided into the following types:

There are five verbal prefixes, which appear as bound morphemes: the causative ka-, the negatives sa- and sou-, and two other semantic modifiers ak- and li-.

Ka-, the causative prefix, makes intransitive verbs into transitive ones. It is the most productive prefix, as it is the only that can precede the other four above. It often occurs in conjunction with a reduplicative vowel suffix. For example, with luwak, "be jealous", an adjective:
Liho luwak: That woman is jealous
Liho kaluwak: That woman was made jealous
Liho kaluwaka lihet: That woman made the [other] woman jealous
Pisek, idle
Soupisek, busy (i.e., un-idle)
Kasoupisek, to make busy

The majority of intransitive verbs have only a transitive causative form: pweipwei > kapweipwei, "to be stupid." Among verbs where ka- is productive, only adjectives and a few resultative intransitive verbs have both intransitive and transitive causative forms. Though the prefix is productive in many active and resultative verbs, it is not productive with neutral intransitive verbs, nor for a handful of intransitives denoting bodily functions such as "sneeze" (asi), "frown" (lolok), "be full" (tip), and "be smelly" (ingirek). The prefix ka- often has assimilative allophones depending on the stem, for example soai (to tell a tale) becomes koasoia (to talk), dou (to climb) becomes kodoudou (to trace one's ancestry), and rir (to be hidden) becomes kerir (secret sweetheart). As illustrated in these examples, the prefix often causes semantic differentiation, necessitating different constructions for literally causative meanings; karirala, a different form employing ka-, is used to mean "to make hidden."

Sa- and sou- negate verbs, however sou- is less productive than sa-, which itself varies in productivity according to regional dialect. The general meaning of sa- appears to be "not," while sou- apparently means "un-," thus:
wehwe, to understand; sawehwe, to not understand
pwung, correct; sapwung, incorrect
nsenoh, concerned; sounsenoh, careless (i.e., un-concerned)

Like ka-, sa- displays assimilative allophony: ese, "to know" > sehse, "to not know;" loalekeng, "intelligent" > soaloalekeng, "not intelligent." Only a single example has been found of sa- preceding ka-: the word koasoakoahiek means "inappropriate," deriving from the verb koahiek, "be competent."

Ak- adds a semantic meaning of demonstration or display when combined with adjectives. When preceded by ka-, it becomes kahk-. Li- generally means "may," or "predisposed, given to" some quality or action.

General intransitive verbs

General intransitive verbs describe actions or events. They are divided into active, resultative, and neutral subtypes. For example, mwenge (to eat) and laid (to fish) are active; langada (to be hung up) and ritidi (to be closed) are resultative (static); and deidei (to sew, to be sewn) and pirap (to steal, to be stolen) are neutral — they can have either an active or a resultative meaning. Though resultative verbs sometimes resemble passive transitive verbs in English, they are in fact a class of intransitive verbs in Pohnpeian, which entirely lacks a comparable active-passive voice distinction. For example, Ohlo pahn kilel means both "That man will take a photograph" and "That man will be photographed." Reduplication is frequently productive among general intransitives and adjectives alike. Derivations often include reduplication: pihs > pipihs (to urinate); us > usuhs (to pull out).

Many intransitives are ablauted from their transitive forms, sometimes with reduplication: apid (trans.) > epid (intrans.) "to carry on one's side," par (trans.) > periper (intrans.) "to cut."

Others are derived from transitive forms through the prefix pV-, conveying a meaning of reciprocal action: kakil (stare) > pekekil (stare at one another). These reciprocal intransitives form a distinct subgroup.

A few intransitives derive from transitive roots through the suffix -ek, though this is a fossilized suffix and is no longer productive. For example, dierek (to be found) from diar (to find); dilipek (for a thatch roof to be mended) from dilip (to mend a thatch roof). Sometimes this results in two intransitive derivations of a single transitive root, usually with a semantic nuance: transitive wengid (to wring), intransitive wengiweng (to wring/be wrung), intransitive wengidek (to be twisted); transitive widinge (to deceive), intransitive widing (to deceive/be deceived); intransitive widingek (to be deceitful). The suffix was apparently much more productive earlier in the language's history, even among active verbs.

Intransitives include verbs that incorporate their objects, in contrast with transitives, which state objects separately; this is somewhat akin to "babysitting" in English. This process sometimes results in vowel shortening within the incorporated noun. Any verbal suffixes, normally suffixed to the initial verb, follow the incorporated object. Incorporation is not possible when there is a demonstrative suffix, however:
I pahn pereklos, I will mat-unroll
I pahn pereki lohs, I will unroll mats
I pahn pereki lohso, I will unroll that mat

Adjectives

Pohnpeian adjectives are a class of non-action intransitive verbs. They function in a mostly parallel way to other intransitive verbs: E pahn [tang/lemei] – "He will run/be cruel"; E [tangtang/lemelemei] – "He is running/being cruel"; E [tenge/lamai] pwutako – "He ran to/is cruel to that boy." Many adjectives themselves can be used as commands, and have transitive counterparts.

Adjectives function as a subclass of intransitive verbs, though grammatical functions set them apart. For example, the superlative -ie is reserved for adjectives, as in lingan, "beautiful," and lingahnie, "most beautiful." Likewise reserved for adjectives is the suffix -ki, which indicates instrumentality in transitive verbs, means "to consider [beautiful]" when suffixed to an adjective. Superlatives may also appear using the ordinal numeral keieu "first." Comparatives are made through word order and the suffix -sang: Pwihke laudsang pwihko means "This pig is bigger than that pig."

One feature setting adjectives apart from non-active verbs is the productivity of the stative marker me (different from the pronoun and focus particle me), which is generally not grammatically correct with intransitive verbs of any kind:
E mwahu, He is good; and E me mwahu, He is good!
E mi mwo, It exists there; but not *E me mi mwo.

Another aspect setting adjectives apart from other intransitives is that adjectives precede numerals, while intransitives follow. Adjectives generally follow the head noun, though possessives and numbers with fractions precede the noun: 
pwutak, boy
pwutako, that boy
pwutak silimeno, those three boys
pwutak reirei silimeno, those three tall boys
nei pwutak silimeno, my three sons there
orenso, that orange
pahkis ehuwen orenso, one-fourth of that orange
mahio, that breadfruit
pahkis siluhwen mahio, three-fourths of that breadfruit

Transitive verbs

Transitive verbs consist of single roots and various suffixes upon modern intransitive verbs. Historically, intransitive verbs probably developed by dropping these transitive suffixes and ablauting.

Some transitive verbs end in -VC on intransitive forms, appearing as unablauted or without reduplication; as intransitives were likely products of final syllable dropping, the endings are rather unpredictable: poad > poadok, "to plant," id > iding, "to make fire," pek > pakad, "to defecate," and dapadap > daper, "to catch."

Several transitive verbs end in -ih on intransitive roots, sometimes also with vowel changes: malen > mahlenih, "to draw," sel > salih, "to tie," and erier > arih, "to stir, probe." This form is the most productive and is used with loanwords. For example: mahlenih, deriving from German mahlen, means "to paint, draw."

Some transitive verbs ending in short final vowels have intransitive counterparts that lack those endings; again, ablaut and reduplication often differentiate. Examples include langa > lang, "to hang up," doakoa > dok, "to spear," and rese > rasaras, "to sharpen." The short vowel ending -i appears only in -ki.

Transitive verbal suffixes include the perfective -ehr, -ki (which derives verbs from nouns; different from the noun instrumental suffix -ki and short vowel suffix), object pronoun suffixes, and a host of directional suffixes. These include -ehng (towards) and -sang (away, without).

Prepositions and Prepositional Nouns
Pohnpeian has two canonical prepositions ni and nan. Nan is used to express the containment of an object in either 2D or 3D space by another object, and ni expresses the attachment of an object to another object.
Lahpo mihmi nan ihwo, 'That person is in the house.'
Kahto mihmi nan pingin likou, 'That cat is on the rug.'
Rihngo mihmi ni pehn liho, 'That ring is on the woman's finger.'
Pwahlo mihmi ni kehpo, 'The crack is in the cup.'

Basic phrases

Below are some basic words and phrases in Pohnpeian:
Kaselehlie - Hello (semi-formal)
Kaselehlie maing - Hello (formal)
Kaselehlie maing ko - Hello (formal plural)
Kaselel - Hello (informal)
Kalahngan - thank you (formal)
Menlau - thank you (informal)
edei - my name
edomw - your name (sg informal)
Ia edomw? - What is your name?
Ia iromw? - How are you (sg informal)?

References

External links 

 Pohnpeian dictionary (1950) in Kaipuleohone
 Lessons in Ponapean (1967) and accompanying audio recordings
 Kitail Lokaiahn Pohnpei: Introductory Lessons in Ponapean (1969)
 Pohnpeian-English word list, approximately 8888 word 
 Written and audio materials for Pohnpeian in Kaipuleohone, some materials are archived under Ponapean
 Pohnpeian-English Online Dictionary

Pohnpeic languages
Languages of the Federated States of Micronesia
Pohnpei